Jelena Janković was the defending champion, but lost in the final to Lesia Tsurenko 4–6, 6–3, 4–6.

Seeds

Draw

Finals

Top half

Bottom half

Qualifying

Seeds

Qualifiers

Lucky losers

Draw

First qualifier

Second qualifier

Third qualifier

Fourth qualifier

Fifth qualifier

Sixth qualifier

References
Main Draw
Qualifying Draw

2016 Singles
Guangzhou International Women's Open Singles
Guangzhou International Women's Open Singles